= Benjamin Mecz =

French Israeli artist

- Born: August 24, 1985; Paris
- Died: December 17, 2017 (aged 32); Tel Aviv Jaffa
- Other names: Ben Mecz
- Education: Bezalel Academy of Arts and Design

Benjamin Mecz (24 August 1985 – 17 December 2017) was an artist who worked between Paris and Tel Aviv. Ben's practice evolved around the activation of both the viewer and the space. He worked with a sense of urgency and took many initiatives while he was an MFA student at Bezalel Academy of Arts and Design Bezalel Academy: he set up a project space (Eti Levi), organized a students trip to Düsseldorf and more. He had a true passion for art and for people and he had the talent to harness it in his work.

== Exhibitions ==
=== Solo shows ===
2011

- RE-CREATIV COMMUNITY, Galerie Bernard Ceysson Paris, France

2013

- TAILLE UNIQUE, Galerie Bernard Ceysson Saint Etienne, France

=== Group shows ===
2009

- The Brick Lane Zoo, Brick Lane Gallery, Londres, Royaume-Uni

2012

- Supervues, Petite surface de l'art contemporain, Hôtel Burrhus, Vaison - la - Romaine, France

2013

- In Media Res, Galerie Georges Verney-Caron, commissariat : Alexis Jakubowicz, en résonance à la XIIe Biennale de Lyon, France

2015

- KNULP, YIA ART FAIR #05, Bibliothèque Historique de la Ville de Paris (BHVP), Paris, France

== Sources ==
- Site officiel
- Exposition Re-Creativ Community (2011)
- Exposition Taille Unique (2013)
- flamme trop vite eteinte de Benjamin mecz
- La tente pièce de l'exposition Taille Unique (2013)
- Art Media Agency (AMA)
- www.carnetdart.com: hommage
- Souncloud.com: hommage
- Décés de l'artiste juif Benjamin Mecz
- Mourir au soleil
- Exposition Taille unique

http://www.shiny-people.com/portfolio/l-art-et-la-matiere/
